Mikhail (Moisei) Davidovich Tovarovsky (October 25, 1903 – January 4, 1969) was a Soviet footballer, coach, and sport administrator from Ukraine.

He was Jewish, and played for KLS Kyiv (1918–1921), Lokomotyv Kyiv (1922–1926), Radtorhsluzhbovtsi Kyiv (1927–1928), Dynamo Kyiv (1928–1929) and Lokomotyv Kyiv again (1929–1930). Tovarovsky also played for the collective city team of Kiev from 1921–1927 in the All-Ukrainian inter-cities championship.

As a coach, he started in the Kiev army club of Kiev Military District (KVO). Later Tovarovsky coached Dynamo Kyiv from 1935–1937 and FC Dynamo Moscow in 1938. Tovarovsky was a USSR Championship bronze medalist in 1937 and was awarded the title of Merited Sports Coach of the USSR in 1947.

From 1939 Tovarovsky worked in the State Central Lenin Order Institute of Physical Culture (GCOLIFK) as an instructor creating there the department of football and hockey in 1962. After World War II, Tovarovsky was a state coach of the All-Union Committee. In 1950s he was a deputy chairman of coaching council of Football Section of USSR.

Tovarovsky was buried at the Don Cemetery in Moscow.

References

External links
 
 Profile on UkrSoccerHistory 
 Profile on www.junik.lv 

1903 births
1969 deaths
People from Kiev Governorate
Ukrainian footballers
Soviet footballers
FC Dynamo Kyiv players
FC Lokomotyv Kyiv players
FC CSKA Kyiv managers
FC Dynamo Kyiv managers
FC Dynamo Moscow managers
Soviet football managers
Jews from the Russian Empire
Jewish Ukrainian sportspeople
Soviet Jews
Jewish footballers
Association football forwards
Sportspeople from Cherkasy Oblast